Misty Vale, also known as the G. W. Karsner House, is a historic home located near Odessa, New Castle County, Delaware.  It was built about 1850, and is a -story, five-bay frame, cross-gable roof house built in a vernacular Victorian style.  It has a frame, three-bay, gable-roofed wing, a hipped-roof, frame addition to the east and an enclosed porch. Also on the property are a square, -story, hipped roof, drive-through granary with a cupola on top and two barns.

It was listed on the National Register of Historic Places in 1985.

References

Houses on the National Register of Historic Places in Delaware
Victorian architecture in Delaware
Houses completed in 1850
Houses in New Castle County, Delaware
National Register of Historic Places in New Castle County, Delaware